Bijon Dasgupta (Bengali: বিজন দাশগুপ্ত) born April 30, 1951 is an Art Director of Indian Film Industry.

Life and career 

Dasgupta made his debut as an art director with Shekhar Kapur's Masoom and the first film itself gave him the recognition and respect that he now enjoys within the industry. Dasgupta strives to make his setup different and look as real as possible. So that the audience could relate to those places. He bagged big movies like Hum Apke Hain Kaun, Gup, Dil, Umrao Jaan, Mr India and many others.

Dasgupta started with a job in Doordarshan as a head of the designing department for 9 years and got to interact with the creative people all over the country.

Filmography 
 2007 - A Mighty Heart - Art Director (India Unit)
 2006 - Umrao Jaan - Art Direction
 2004 - Garv - Pride and Honor - Art Director
 2003 - Parwana - Art Director
 2003 - Main Prem Ki Diwani Hoon - Art Director

Awards 
 1996 - Filmfare Best Art Direction Award for Prem

External links 
 http://www.ibnlive.com/

1951 births
Living people
Indian art directors
Place of birth missing (living people)